Lucrezia Landriani (born c. 1440 – living 17 August 1507) was the mistress of Galeazzo Maria Sforza, Duke of Milan, and the mother of his renowned illegitimate daughter, Caterina Sforza, Lady of Imola, Countess of Forlì. Lucrezia had three other children by the Duke, and two by her husband.

Biography
Around 1450 Lucrezia married Cristoforo Lampugnani, son of Lucrezia Visconti and Giovanni Andrea Lampugnani. Later, she married Count Gian Piero Landriani, a courtier at the ducal court and a close friend of Galeazzo Maria Sforza (24 January 1444 – 26 December 1476), son of Francesco Sforza, Duke of Milan and Bianca Maria Visconti, Duchess of Milan. Galeazzo Maria would become Duke of Milan upon the death of his father on 8 March 1466. 

Lucrezia was born in Milan around 1440; nothing further, however, is known of her early years, or her parentage. A contemporary portrait of Lucrezia painted by Domenico Veneziano, shows her to have been quite beautiful, with blonde hair, blue eyes, a high forehead, and fine features. She bore her husband Gian Piero two children and undertook their guidance and education, a son, Piero Landriani, who later became castellan of the fortress of Forlimpopoli; and a daughter, Bianca Landriani, who married Tommaso Feo, castellan of Ravaldino Castle and the brother-in-law of Caterina Sforza.

Lucrezia became Galeazzo Maria's mistress sometime around 1460, when he was sixteen years of age, and she bore him at least four children:

 Carlo Sforza, Count of Magenta (1461 – 9 May 1483), married Bianca Simonetta (died 1487), by whom he had two daughters, Angela Sforza (1479–1497), and Ippolita Sforza (1481–1520). The latter married Alessandro Bentivoglio by whom she had issue, including a daughter Violante, who became the wife of condottiero Giovanni Paolo I Sforza, an illegitimate son of Ludovico il Moro Sforza by Lucrezia Crivelli.
 Caterina Sforza, Lady of Imola, Countess of Forli (early 1463 – 28 May 1509), married three times.
 Alessandro Sforza, Lord of Francavilla (1465–1523), married Barbara dei Conti Balbiani di Valchiavenna, by whom he had a daughter, Camilla.
 Chiara Sforza (1467–1531), married firstly, Pietro, Count dal Verme di Sanguinetto, Lord of Vigevano, and secondly, Fregosino Fregoso, Lord of Novi, by whom she had issue.

Lucrezia's children were legitimised and raised at the ducal court, alongside Galeazzo's legitimate children by his second wife Bona of Savoy. They were, however, entrusted into the care of their paternal grandmother, Bianca Maria Visconti. The most gifted, and remarkable child of Galeazzo and Lucrezia was Caterina, who was instructed in the arts of diplomacy and warfare by her grandmother. These were necessary skills in the political ambience of 15th century Italy, which was marked by intrigue, treachery, assassinations, and continuous strife, caused by the intense rivalry of the city-states and their rulers.

On 26 December 1476, Galeazzo Maria Sforza was stabbed to death inside the church of San Stefano in Milan. His only legitimate son by Bona of Savoy, Gian Galeazzo Sforza, succeeded him as Duke of Milan.

References

Bibliography
 

1440 births
Year of death missing
Nobility from Milan
House of Sforza
15th-century Italian nobility
15th-century Italian women